Paradyemus nodicollis is a species of beetle in the family Cerambycidae, and the only species in the genus Paradyemus. It was described by Breuning in 1951.

References

Apomecynini
Beetles described in 1951
Monotypic beetle genera